The Baroudeurs de Pia XIII, later known as the Pia Donkeys, are a French Rugby league team based in Pia, Pyrénées-Orientales in the Languedoc-Roussillon region. The Baroudeurs play in the Elite Two Championship during their existence they were the reserve team of the Elite One Championship team SM Pia XIII (the original Pia Donkeys), until that team ceased competing in Elite One and the reserve Baroudeurs were absorbed under the SM banner. Home games are played at the Stade Daniel-Ambert

History 

The club was formed in 2000 by the former successful top flight club SM Pia XIII to act as their official reserve side. The Baroudeurs, which translates as Fighters were one of the strongest clubs at their level. In season 2003/04 they reached their first league final in the National Division 1 but lost against Vedene XIII 6-42. The next two seasons brought more final heartache as they lost firstly against Salses XIII 20-36 and then to Villeneuve Tolosane 14-30, that season 2005/06 did bring some success when they won the Coupe Falcou to win their first trophy. 2006/07 brought relegation but the following season they registered a league and cup double. They beat RC Lescure-Arthes XIII 'A' in the league 30-6 and also lifted the Coupe Falcou for a second time.  As a reserve side they wouldn't have been allowed to play in the same league as their first team and so when SM Pia XIII announced they were going to drop out of the top flight at the end of season 2012/13 the reserve Baroudeurs were absorbed under the SM banner. In the 2018-19 season the Baroudeurs returned to the Elite Two Championship.

Current squad
2021-22 Squad;
Adrien Bansept
Etienne Bezo
Arthur Bidaut
Elian Billerach
Tom Bonillo
Sylvain Bonnet
Quentin Brail
Maxime Capdeillayre
Kader Cherat
Theo Coll
Joao Paulo de Oliveira
Nito de Souza
Hugo Fenoy
Nicolas Franck
Maxime Garcia
Gregory Gimenez
Vincent Gonzalez
Marc Janicot
Anthony Leger
Sofian Madani
Adam Madouri
Mathias Marty
Sylvain Masuaute
Quentin Maury
Quentin Maussang
Clement Meunier
Quentin Morlaas
Cedric Pacull
Nicolas Roca
Loic Rosemplatt
Olivier Ruiz
Laurian Regne
Sebastien Terrado

Honours 

 French Championship (4): 1995–96, 2005–06, 2006–07, 2012–13
 Lord Derby Cup (3): 1975, 2006, 2007
 National Division 2 (1): 2016–17

Records 

 Biggest Victory: 126-4 against Carpentras in the 2005/2006 season of the Elite Championship.
 Biggest Defeat: 0-72 against Whitehaven in the 2006 Challenge Cup.

References

External links 

 Pia fansite

French rugby league teams
Sport in Pyrénées-Orientales
1960 establishments in France
Rugby clubs established in 1960